The 1920 Rutgers Queensmen football team represented Rutgers University as an independent during the 1920 college football season. In their eighth season under head coach George Sanford, the Queensmen compiled a 2–7 record and were outscored by their opponents, 132 to 32. The team's two victories were against Maryland (6-0) and Virginia Tech (19-6). The losses included games against Nebraska (0-28) and West Virginia (0-17). Coach Sanford was inducted into the College Football Hall of Fame in 1971.

Schedule

References

Rutgers
Rutgers Scarlet Knights football seasons
Rutgers Queensmen football